HSC Our Lady Patricia was a high speed catamaran ferry which operated between the Isle of Wight and mainland England. She operated on the Wightlink Ryde Pier to Portsmouth route from 1986 to 2006, in conjunction with her sister ship HSC Our Lady Pamela, after which she was sold. She was scrapped at Marchwood in 2006.

References 

Incat high-speed craft
1985 ships
Individual catamarans
Ships built by Incat